was an English land law case which reformulated the tests for an easement (the scope of the law of easements). It found an easement to use a communal garden to be a valid easement in law. There is no requirement for all of the houses to be immediately next to the garden to benefit from it.

Facts
Ellenborough Park is a  park in Weston-super-Mare (split by a minor road, not considered by either side, nor the courts consequential). The larger park was owned in 1855 by two tenants in common who sold off outlying parts for the building of houses, and granted rights in the purchase/sale deeds to the house owners (and expressly to their successors in title) to enjoy the parkland which remained.

The land was enjoyed freely until 1955, when Judge Danckwerts delivered his decision on a complex dispute at first instance. The knub of the case appealed centred on a monetary question affecting the land for the first time. It centred on the fact that the War Office had used the land during World War II, and compensation was due to be paid to the neighbours (if correctly alleging a proprietary interest to use the land, namely an easement) or the landowner, the trustees of the original owner if they were the sole person(s) with an owning interest (under the Compensation Defence Act 1939, section 2 (1)).

The landowner (of the park), the beneficiaries of the trust of the original owners of the land, challenged the assertion of an "easement" from the immediate neighbours enjoying the expressed right to use the park in their deeds (title), which they in practice also regularly enjoyed. They stated these neighbouring owner-occupiers (and their tenants) had only a personal advantage (a licence, with no proprietary rights), and not an easement proper (which would include proprietary rights).

Judgment
Lord Evershed MR held the occupiers of the properties in question did enjoy an easement over Ellenborough Park. He determined that four criteria for defining an easement existed, taken from Cheshire's Modern Real Property, and said:

See also

Easements in English law

Notes
References

Notes

References
N Gravells (ed), Landmark Cases in Land Law (2013)

English property case law
English land case law
Court of Appeal (England and Wales) cases
1955 in British law
1955 in case law